Sexy Beast is a 2000 British crime film directed by Jonathan Glazer (in his feature film directorial debut) and written by Louis Mellis and David Scinto. It stars Ray Winstone, Ben Kingsley, and Ian McShane. It follows Gary "Gal" Dove (Winstone), a retired ex-gangster visited by a violent gangster (Kingsley) who demands that he take part in a bank job.

Sexy Beast was critically acclaimed and Kingsley's performance earned him an Oscar nomination for Best Supporting Actor. In 2004, Total Film named Sexy Beast the 15th best British film. It was the final film to feature the actor Cavan Kendall, who died of cancer shortly after filming ended.

Plot
The British ex-criminal Gary "Gal" Dove is happily retired in Spain with his beloved wife DeeDee, his best friend Aitch and Aitch's wife Jackie. An old criminal associate, the feared sociopath Don Logan, arrives at Gal's villa, intent on enlisting Gal for a bank robbery in London planned by crimelord Teddy Bass. Teddy has learned about the bank vault from Harry, the bank's chairman, whom he met at an orgy. Gal declines, but Don continues to pressure Gal, growing increasingly aggressive and violent.

After Gal suggests Don's real reason for visiting is his infatuation with Jackie, with whom he had a brief affair, Don grows furious and leaves for England. On the plane, Don refuses to extinguish his cigarette prior to takeoff, is aggressive to staff and other passengers, and is ejected. He returns to the villa screaming obscenities and attacks Gal with a bottle. DeeDee aims Gal's shotgun at Don. The group shoot and beat him to death and bury him under Gal's swimming pool.

In London, Gal prepares for the heist. When Teddy questions Gal about Don's whereabouts, Gal claims Don returned to London and called him from Heathrow Airport. The heist involves using diving gear to drill into the bank vault from a pool in a neighbouring bath house. The pool water floods the vault and shorts its security system. As Teddy's crew empties the vault's safe deposit boxes, Gal secretly pockets a pair of ruby and diamond earrings.

After the job, Teddy insists on driving Gal to the airport. He stops at Harry's home, where he kills Harry and demands that Gal tell him where Don is. Gal responds that he is "not into this any more". In the car, Teddy indicates that he knows Gal was involved in something happening to Don, and implies that Gal would be severely punished if Teddy cared at all about Don. He suggests he may visit Gal in Spain and humiliates him by paying him only £10 for the job.

Gal returns to his friends and family in Spain, where DeeDee wears the earrings and life has returned to normal. Gal still hears Don's voice in his head; he responds that Don is dead now and can "shut up".

Cast
 Ray Winstone as Gary 'Gal' Dove, a retired criminal who married DeeDee and moved to Spain to start a new life
 Ben Kingsley as Don Logan, a violent sociopath and recruiter for the London underworld
 Ian McShane as Teddy Bass, a London crime boss 
 Amanda Redman as DeeDee Dove, Gal's beloved wife and a former porn star
 James Fox as Harry, a banker who shows Bass the vault
 Cavan Kendall as Aitch, Dove's best friend
 Julianne White as Jackie, Aitch's wife, who had a fling with Logan
 Álvaro Monje as Enrique, a Spanish boy who helps Gal around the house

Production

The film was shot in London and Spain in the summer of 1999. Ray Winstone travelled to Spain two weeks before filming commenced to get as deep a tan as he could in the time possible and to eat as much as he could to bulk up considerably. He called it "the best rehearsal time I've ever had in my life." Winstone had originally been considered for the role of Don, along with Anthony Hopkins.

The producer Jeremy Thomas remembered his experience making the film: "Sexy Beast was the beginning of a new phase for me of working with first-time filmmakers. Jonathan Glazer was a television commercials director in the UK, and a wonderful talent. We were sent this script which he was attached to, and out came this wonderful film. It was very stimulating having a first time talent... The dialogue as you see in this film is exceptional. I had never read a script like it, and I thought, this has got to be made. It was very difficult to get insurance on the film actually. When the American studio bought the film, their legal department said: "You cannot make this." It has something like 300 uses of the word "cunt", and 400 "fucks", but somehow it passed the censorship and got out there." Technical elements of the heist have been compared with those in the 1979 film Sewers of Gold, which also starred McShane in the central role.

Reception
, the film has an approval rating of 86% on Rotten Tomatoes, based on 138 reviews with an average rating of 7.30/10. The site's critical consensus states, "Sexy Beast rises above other movies in the British gangster genre due to its performances—particularly an electrifying one by Ben Kingsley—and the script's attention to character development." On Metacritic, it has a rating of 79/100, indicating "generally favorable reviews". It received praise from writers at the San Francisco Chronicle, Entertainment Weekly, Slate, Rolling Stone and the Los Angeles Times. Stephen Hunter of The Washington Post was less enthusiastic and described some of the film's moments as "Ben Kingsley spraying saliva-lubricated variants of the F-word into the atmosphere like anti-aircraft fire for 10 solid minutes."

Box office

Sexy Beast grossed $10.2 million on a budget of $4.3 million, making it a relative box office success.

Awards and honours

Kingsley's performance received a majority of the accolades given to Sexy Beast, winning Best Supporting Actor awards from the Broadcast Film Critics Association, Boston Society of Film Critics, Dallas-Fort Worth Film Critics Association, Florida Film Critics Circle, San Diego Film Critics Society, Southeastern Film Critics Association and the Toronto Film Critics Association. He also was nominated for a Screen Actors Guild Award (losing to Ian McKellen for his performance in The Lord of the Rings: The Fellowship of the Ring), a Golden Globe and an Academy Award (losing both to Jim Broadbent for his performance in Iris). The film also won Best Director and Best Screenplay from the British Independent Film Awards and Special Recognition ("For excellence in film making") from the National Board of Review.

Music
Original music by English electronic band UNKLE in collaboration with South and also Spanish composer/saxophonist Roque Baños. Dean Martin's version of "Sway" accompanies the film's end credits. The soundtrack also includes "Peaches" by The Stranglers, "Cuba" by The Gibson Brothers, "G-Spot" by Wayne Marshall, "Daddy Rollin' Stone" by Derek Martin, and Henry Mancini's "Lujon" (from the 1961 LP "Mr. Lucky Goes Latin").

Cultural references 
Vocalist and guitarist Brian Sella of American folk punk band The Front Bottoms attributes the band's name to this film.
The film was also the inspiration behind The Kooks song 'Jackie Big Tits', after a line spoken by Ben Kingsley's character.

Prequel television series 
A prequel television series based on the film was in development at Paramount Network, which was being produced by Paramount Television Studios and Anonymous Content. However, the series was scrapped by Paramount Network. On February 15, 2022, ViacomCBS Networks UK And Australia announced that the series was revived for Paramount+, but will instead be produced  by Chapter One and Paramount International Networks.

See also
 Gangster No. 1
 44 Inch Chest
 Heist film
 List of hood films

References

External links

 
 
 
 
 
 

2000 films
2000 crime thriller films
2000 independent films
2000 LGBT-related films
British crime thriller films
British gangster films
British heist films
British independent films
British LGBT-related films
English-language Spanish films
Film4 Productions films
Films about murderers
Films directed by Jonathan Glazer
Films produced by Jeremy Thomas
Films set in London
Films set in Spain
Films shot in England
Films shot in Almería
Fox Searchlight Pictures films
LGBT-related thriller films
Male bisexuality in film
Films scored by Roque Baños
British neo-noir films
2000 directorial debut films
Films shot in Bedfordshire
2000s English-language films
2000s British films